Estevan (South) Airport  was a registered aerodrome located  south of Estevan, Saskatchewan, Canada.

See also 
 List of airports in Saskatchewan
 Estevan Regional Aerodrome
 Estevan/Bryant Airport
 Estevan (Blue Sky) Aerodrome
 List of defunct airports in Canada

References

External links
Page about this airport on COPA's Places to Fly airport directory

Registered aerodromes in Saskatchewan
Estevan No. 5, Saskatchewan
Transport in Estevan